Balaji Motion Pictures is a wholly-owned subsidiary company of Balaji Telefilms Limited which is an Indian film production and distribution company established by Shobha Kapoor and her daughter Ekta Kapoor. Based in Mumbai, it produces and distributes Hindi films. The chairman of the company is former Bollywood actor Jeetendra Kapoor.

In 2017, the company launched its biography, Kingdom of the Soap Queen: The Story of Balaji Telefilms.

Operations
Balaji Motion Pictures is based in Mumbai in the Balaji House on New Link Road, Andheri West, Mumbai. It operates from its head office in Andheri West and has studios in Film City and other locations in Mumbai. In terms of studio facilities, Balaji Motion Pictures is one of the largest film production houses in Mumbai.

History 

Balaji Motion Pictures was set up in 2001 by Hindi television producer Ekta Kapoor with the purpose of venturing into film production. She produced Kyo Kii... Main Jhuth Nahin Bolta, released in 2001 with Govinda and Sushmita Sen in the lead roles. The film was a failure at the box office, collecting . Later, the company produced Kucch To Hai (2003), Krishna Cottage (2004) and Koi Aap Sa (2005), all of which did not fare well at the box office.

In 2005, the company produced and released Kyaa Kool Hai Hum, which grossed  and made it to the top 10 films of 2005.

In 2007, the company co-produced Shootout at Lokhandwala with Sanjay Gupta. It was a critical and commercial success, collecting  worldwide.

In 2008, the company produced and released C Kkompany, which was a critical and commercial failure. In the same year, the company co-produced Mission Istanbul and EMI – Liya Hai Toh Chukana Parega with Sunil Shetty. Both films failed critically and commercially. In the same year, the company acquired the distribution rights of Bhool Bhulaiyaa (2007) and Sarkar Raj (2008) with a deal of almost . The films were both commercially successful, thereby marking a step further of Balaji.

In 2010, the company sub-branded ALT Entertainment, a youth-focused brand and produced a low-budget film, Love Sex aur Dhokha, which proved to be a sleeper hit at the box office. In the same year, the company released Once Upon a Time in Mumbaai, which was also a critical and commercial success. The film marked the company's successful entry into film.

In 2011, the company marked its entry into Marathi films by producing Taryanche Bait. The film was a critical and commercial hit and won many accolades including three awards for Best Film. The company also released Shor in the City, a small-budget critically acclaimed film. The same year also saw the release of Ragini MMS, co-produced with Amit Kapoor and Sidhartha M. Jain. The film won the Stardust Award for Best Film, and Ekta Kapoor announced the sequel of the film would be released in 2013, starring Indo-Canadian actress Sunny Leone. The company released The Dirty Picture starring Vidya Balan on 2 December 2011. This proved to be a major blockbuster and was regarded as one of the best films of 2011, winning Vidya Balan her first National Award and numerous acting awards of 2011 for her performance. The film won six awards for Best Film.

In April 2013, the company released the horror film Ek Thi Daayan, co-produced with Vishal Bhardwaj. It received positive reviews from critics and received 3 out of 5 on average. Jinson John of Indian Box Office stated "Ek Thi Daayan is not that regular Bhootiya Isshtoorry, the plot stands out of them all, it's surely is an experimental plot, but not written by an idiot."

In May 2013, the company released Shootout at Wadala. The film opened to mixed-to-positive reviews. Bollywood Hungama rated the film with  stars whereas The Times of India rated it  stars. The film was declared "average" by Box Office India. In July 2013, the company released Lootera, starring Sonakshi Sinha and Ranveer Singh as leads. It opened to positive reviews from critics. Taran Adarsh of Bollywood Hungama rated the film  stars, saying, "On the whole, LOOTERA is an intrinsically earnest and profoundly heartwarming story that stays in your heart. An absolute must for those who love romantic films or are romantic at heart. This one's a cinematic gem!" Raja Sen of Rediff.com gave it  stars and noted, "Lootera is a gorgeous, gorgeous film, one that uses its period setting affectionately, with loving detail, and not exploitatively, as our cinema is wont to do." Meena Iyer of The Times of India assigned the film  stars and noted, "Lootera is a love saga of yore... You may find this film boring if state-of-the-art, slow romance is not your idea of a movie outing."

In August 2013, the company released Once Upon ay Time in Mumbai Dobaara!, the sequel to one of its most successful films, Once Upon a Time in Mumbaai. The film opened to negative reviews from critics, some of whom slammed it for its poor drafting and execution of storyline.

On February 28, 2014, the company released Shaadi Ke Side Effects starring Farhan Akhtar and Vidya Balan. It opened to positive reviews and collected  on its first day. It grossed  in its opening weekend. It grossed  worldwide during its lifetime run and was declared "below average" by Box Office India. 

On March 21, 2014, the company released Ragini MMS 2, starring Sunny Leone, the sequel to another successful film of the company, Ragini MMS. The film was a major commercial success and was declared a "hit" by Box Office India.

On April 4, 2014, the company released Main Tera Hero, starring Varun Dhawan as the protagonist, directed by David Dhawan. It received positive reviews from critics. Taran Adarsh of Bollywood Hungama rated it  stars, and wrote "On the whole, Main Tera Hero is a wild, wacky, madcap entertainer that has the unmistakable stamp of the master of entertainers -- David Dhawan. An over-the-top plot, humor quotient and performances are three aces the film stands on. The film should work well with admirers of typical Bollywood masalathons, also because Varun Dhawan pulls off the act with flamboyance and bowls you over with an uproarious act in this zany entertainer. Go, have fun and laugh out loud!" Srijana Mitra Das of The Times of India gave the movie  stars, saying, "Main Tera Hero is a pav bhaji picture, quick, spicy, hot. It has the depth of a comic strip but it also has its neon-shaded fun. For those who want a light laugh, here's your boy."

On May 30, 2014, the company released the small-budget film Kuku Mathur Ki Jhand Ho Gayi, co-produced by Bejoy Nambiar. It opened to mixed reviews from critics and also failed to collect at the box office. It collected a mere , thereby recovering its costs.

In June 2014, the company released Ek Villain co-starring celebrities Sidharth Malhotra, Shraddha Kapoor and Riteish Deshmukh. It opened up to positive reviews from critics. Taran Adarsh of Bollywood Hungama awarded the movie 4/5 stars and wrote, "On the whole, Ek Villain is a stylish, spellbinding and terrifying edge-of-the-seat thriller. It's a step forward in this genre, without a doubt. A sure-shot winner!" Raedita Tandon from Filmfare gave the film  stars and noted that, "Though indulgent in parts, Ek Villain packs in a punch. Copy of a Korean film or not, it's ‘good’ paisa vasool entertainment. Make it your weekend watch." Meena Iyer of The Times of India gave the film  stars, stating that "You cannot fault the scale of Ek Villain or berate its lead star cast. But you wish you could celebrate this thriller like you did Suri's last movie outing Aashiqui 2." The film was declared a "super hit" by Box Office India.

Film production

Upcoming films

Film distribution

References

External links 
 
 
 
 Balaji Motion Pictures on YouTube

Hindi cinema
Mass media companies established in 2002
Film production companies based in Mumbai
2002 establishments in Maharashtra
Balaji Telefilms